The southern mapleleaf (Quadrula apiculata) is a species of freshwater mussel, an aquatic bivalve mollusk in the family Unionidae, the river mussels.

This species is endemic to the United States.

References

 Turgeon, D. D., A. E. Bogan, E. V. Coan, W. K. Emerson, W. G. Lyons, W. Pratt, et al. 1988. . Downloaded on 9 March 2008.

Quadrula
Endemic fauna of the United States
Bivalves described in 1829